Rick Ellis may refer to:

 Rick Ellis (New Zealander), executive with Telstra Digital Media, formerly CEO of New Zealand's state broadcaster TVNZ
 Rick Ellis, founder of EllisLab, the company behind ExpressionEngine and CodeIgniter

See also
Rick Elice (born 1956), writer
Richard Ellis (disambiguation)